Spiess (spelt as  in German or Spiesz in Hungarian), may refer to:

People with the surname 
 Adolf Spieß, German gymnast and educator
 August von Spiess, Romanian officer, writer & hunter
 Christian Heinrich Spiess, German writer of romances
 Fred Spiess, American oceanographer
 Fritz Spiess, Canadian cinematographer
 Gerry Spiess, American sailor
 Gertrud Spiess (1914–1995), Swiss politician
 Gesine Spieß (1945–2016), German feminist academic
 Joseph Spiess (engineer) (1838-1917), built France's only rigid airship
 Mary Lou Spiess (1931-1992), American disability rights advocate and disabled fashion pioneer
 Robert Spieß, tennis player at 1912 Olympics

Military 
 Spieß (Hauptfeldwebel), German military slang name (literally "spear") for the Company sergeant major in the German Wehrmacht until 1945
 Spieß (Hauptfeldwebel), the Company sergeant major in the GDR National People's Army until 1990
 Spieß (Kompaniefeldwebel), informal name for the Company sergeant major in the German Bundeswehr
 Spieß, (Dienstfuehrender Unteroffizier) the Company sergeant major in Austrian Bundesheer

See also 
 Spiess Tuning, the common name of Siegfried Spiess Motorenbau GmbH, a German engine tuning company.
 Spies (disambiguation) (ending in one "S")

German-language surnames